Gavrilović (Cyrillic script: Гавриловић) is a predominantly Serbian and to a lesser extent Croatian surname, derived from the male given name "Gavrilo" (Gabriel). It may refer to:

Andrija Gavrilović (born 1965), Serbian-Italian basketball coach
Bogdan Gavrilović (1864–1947), Serbian mathematician, philosopher, and educator
Dragutin Gavrilović (1882–1945), notable Serbian and, later, Yugoslav military officer
Goran Gavrilović (born 1963), former Serbian professional footballer
Mihailo Gavrilović (1868–1924), prominent Serbian historian and diplomat
Miroslav Gavrilović (1930–1920), Serbian Patriarch as Irinej I

Sanja Gavrilović (born 1982), hammer thrower from Croatia
Željko Gavrilović (born 1971), veteran Serbian footballer

It may also refer to:

Gavrilović (company), the oldest Croatian meat and sausage manufacturer, founded in 1620 and based in Petrinja

See also
Gavrić

Patronymic surnames
Serbian surnames
Croatian surnames
Surnames from given names